Harry Johnson may refer to:

Sports
 Harry Samuel Johnson, known as Steamboat Johnson (1880–1951), professional baseball umpire
 Harry Johnson (boxer) (1887–1947), British boxer, Olympic medalist in 1908
 Harry Johnson (footballer, born 1876) (1876–1940), English right half with Sheffield United and England
 Harry Johnson (footballer, born 1899) (1899–1981), English striker with Sheffield United and Mansfield Town
 Harry Johnson (footballer, born 1910) (1910–1981), English forward with Oldham Athletic, Southend United, Exeter City and Scunthorpe United
 Harry Johnson (footballer, born 1913) (1913–1976), English left back with Newcastle United, Port Vale and Hartlepools United
 , American tennis player, 1915 U.S. Open mixed doubles champion
 Harry Johnson (wrestler) (1903–?), British wrestler

Other
 Harry John Johnson (1826–1884), English landscape and water colour painter
 Harry Johnson (bartender), American bartender
 Harry McClure Johnson (1886–1932), Chicago lawyer, Offend, Bulkley, Poole and Scott
 Harry E. Johnson, American attorney and law professor, former president of Alpha Phi Alpha fraternity
 Harry H. Johnson (1895–1987), US general who commanded the 2nd Cavalry Division and the 93rd Infantry Division during World War II
 Harry Gordon Johnson (1923–1977), Canadian economist
 Harry Zephaniah Johnson, known as Harry J (1945–2013), Jamaican reggae record producer
 Harry Johnson, character in Best Friends Together

See also
 Harold Johnson (disambiguation)
 Harriet Johnson (disambiguation)
 Harry Johnston (disambiguation)
 Henry Johnson (disambiguation)